Dinwiddie is an unincorporated community in Eagle Creek Township, Lake County, Indiana.

History
Dinwiddie was the name of a family of pioneer settlers.

The Chicago and Wabash Valley Railroad attempted to build a line through here from 1898, which was to run from Rensselaer on the Monon Railroad to Crown Point and Gary. The Monon took over in 1914, and left the project unfinished north of Dinwiddie which hence became a railroad terminus. The stub line was abandoned in 1935.

Geography

References

Unincorporated communities in Lake County, Indiana
Unincorporated communities in Indiana